Saddle the Wind is a 1958 American Western film directed by Robert Parrish, written by Rod Serling, produced by Armand Deutsch, and starring Robert Taylor, Julie London and John Cassavetes. The picture was filmed in Metrocolor and CinemaScope.

Plot
Retired gunslinger and former Confederate soldier Steve Sinclair (Robert Taylor) is living as a rancher in a small western community. He collaborates with the main landowner Dennis Deneen (Donald Crisp), from whom he rents the ranch, to preserve communal stability.

His quiet life is disrupted by the appearance of his emotionally unstable younger brother Tony (John Cassavetes) and Tony's beautiful girlfriend Joan (Julie London). Tony has also brought back with him a new beautiful handmade six gun with a filed down trigger. He goes out into the yard to show off his quick draw skills with his other prize possession. The scene ends with Tony finally shooting an image of himself in a pool of water.

An old rival of Steve's, gunman Larry Venables (Charles McGraw), also arrives on the scene looking for Steve. Gun crazy Tony challenges Venables to draw on him. When a reluctant but belligerent Venables gets distracted Tony kills him. His success goes to his head and he gets drunk, ignoring Joan. Steve is mad about the shooting and tells his younger brother that Venable was one of the faster gunfighters he ever knew, and that he got lucky.

A new problem arises with the arrival of Clay Ellison (Royal Dano), a farmer who plans to fence off a strip of land he inherited from his deceased father. The land is currently grazed by cattle and is part of the open range. Ellison has plans to grow wheat on the land and plans to put up barbed wire to keep the cattle off the property. Tony attempts to drive off Ellison, but Steve intervenes.

Ellison appeals to Deneen, who agrees to defend Ellison's legal rights to the land. However Tony murders Ellison when he attempts to buy provisions in town. Deneen breaks his ties with the Sinclairs. Steve intends to leave the ranch, but Tony tries to take over. Steve drives him off, but Tony confronts Deneen and attempts to kill him. Both are wounded in the gunfight. Deneen's men agree to let Steve find Tony if he puts on his guns which he has not worn in years. Tony has fled into the hills. When Steve finds him, Tony shoots himself echoing the earlier scene of shooting himself in the pool of water. Steve tells the wounded Deneen his brother is dead. Deneen persuades him to stay on at the ranch.

Cast
 Robert Taylor as Steve Sinclair
 John Cassavetes as Tony Sinclair
 Julie London as Joan Blake
 Royal Dano as Clay Ellison
 Charles McGraw as Larry Venables
 Donald Crisp as Dennis Deneen
 Richard Erdman as Dallas Hanson
 Douglas Spencer as Hemp Scribner 
 Ray Teal as Brick Larson
 Irene Tedrow as Mrs. Mary Ellison (uncredited)

Production
The film was shot on location in the Rocky Mountains in Colorado.

Release
The film opened in 36 cities in the Far-West-Denver exchange area on March 5, 1958.

According to MGM records, the film made $1,005,000 in the U.S. and Canada and $1,075,000 in other markets, resulting in a loss of $308,000.

References

External links
 
 
 
 

1958 films
1958 Western (genre) films
American Western (genre) films
Metro-Goldwyn-Mayer films
Films directed by Robert Parrish
Films with screenplays by Rod Serling
1950s English-language films
1950s American films